Simon Gilbert may refer to:
 Simon Gilbert (journalist) (born 1984), English journalist
 Simon Gilbert (musician) (born 1965), English drummer
 Simon Gilbert (tenor) (born before 1967), English actor and tenor